Paranotoreas is a genus of moths in the family Geometridae. It was described by Robin C. Craw in 1986.

Species
Species in this genus include:

 Paranotoreas brephosata (Walker, 1862)
 Paranotoreas ferox (Butler, 1877)
 Paranotoreas fulva (Hudson, 1905)
 Paranotoreas opipara (Philpott, 1915) 
 Paranotoreas zopyra (Meyrick, 1883)

References

Geometridae
Taxa named by Robin Craw
Endemic fauna of New Zealand
Endemic moths of New Zealand